Virumaandi is a 2004 Indian Tamil-language action drama film written, co-edited, produced, and directed by Kamal Haasan, who also performed in the title role. The film revolves around the interview of two prison inmates, firstly, Kothala Thevar's (Pasupathy) life sentence, and secondly, Virumaandi (Haasan), who is sentenced to be hanged. The criminals express how they feel about the direction that their lives have taken and how they have ended up where they are. The film's narrative is based on the Rashomon effect. The cast also includes Abhirami, Napoleon, Rohini Molleti, Shanmugarajan, and Nassar in pivotal roles. The film's score and soundtrack were composed by Ilaiyaraaja. The film won critical acclaim and was a commercial success at the box office. It also marked Rohini’s comeback film after an 8-year hiatus from acting.

Plot 

In Chennai, Angela Kathamuthu, a civil rights activist, and her cameraman in Madras Central Prison interview prisoners serving life imprisonment and awaiting the death sentence, for her PhD thesis in law, against the death penalty. When she enters the prison for the second day, there is a sit-in protest, demanding the reason for the sudden death of death penalty convict Narayanan, who secretly told Angela, the previous day, about the immoral practices of Deputy-Jailer Peykkaman. Angela meets Kothala Thevar, who is serving a life sentence for assisting in the murder of 24 people in Theni district. He tells his version of the story that led to his conviction.

According to Kothala, the root cause of the problem is Virumaandi Thevar, a happy-go-lucky rogue. Virumaandi has a large part of the land in CK Patti, their village, and has high underground water levels, which is eyed by every other farmer. Virumaandi lost his mother when he was 12. He was taken to Chennai and later to Singapore by his father Thavasi Thevar. Even after Thavasi died, Virumandi still lived there, but at the age of 25, Virumaandi was convicted for a small crime and exiled back to India. He comes back to live with his paternal grandmother in CK Patti and practice agriculture. His support to his uncle Kothala in his clash against Nallama Nayakkar brings about a bonding between the two, as Nayakkar killed Kothala's father in a melee caused during a peace meeting between Thavasi and Kothala's father. Annalakshmi, Kothala's niece, falls in love with Virumaandi. Kothala, with an eye on the fertile land owned by Virumaandi, does not object to the romance. Meanwhile, Virumandi's grandmother dies, and at the funeral, Nayakkar offers a huge sum for Virumandi's land. Virumandi rejects the bid, insults both Kothala and Nayakkar, and warns everyone from buying his land. Within a week, an assassination attempt is made on Virumaandi. He is injured and brought to the hospital by Annalakshmi. Virumandi realizes his love for Annalakshmi and rejoins with Kothala. Annalakshmi secretly gives Virumandi the evidence that Kothala is the one who tried to kill him. Virumandi attacks Kothala and his gang, but Kothala again blames the murder attempt on Nayakkar, and Virumandi goes to file a complaint on Nayakkar. A Panchayat is held to solve this issue, and in the ensuing peace meeting of eight villages, Virumaandi's gang is verbally humiliated. Virumaandi goes to Nayakkar's village to take revenge at night, and Kothala's gang is forced to save him, where 24 lives are taken. Virumaandi saves all of them by his false testification so that he can marry Annalakshmi, but Kothala seemingly refused the marriage. According to Kothala, Annalakshmi was abducted by Virumaandi and brutally raped. She later escapes from him, comes home, tells what happened, and commits suicide by hanging herself. A clash between Virumaandi and Kothala takes place in which six henchmen are killed. Virumaandi then escapes and kills Nayakkar but is later caught by the police. In the 26 people murder case, Virumaandi testifies against Kothala's gang, getting them all 15-year sentences, while Virumaandi gets a five-year sentence for raping Annalakshmi and then the death penalty for the six people murder case. Here, Kothala stops and says that God has given justice, but Virumaandi is still angry.

Angela tries to make Virumaandi talk, but Virumaandi verbally assaults her. Finally, Angela says that she is doing a PhD against the death penalty as her father, who got her married to James by hard work, was forced to kill James to save her from marital abuse. Her father was hanged in the same prison, and then she chose law as a career. After much resentment and objection, Virumaandi agrees to turn to tell his version to Angela. Virumaandi, 25, a manual laborer, was sent back to home from Singapore for taking responsibility for his cousin's fault. His only relation was his grandmother, who practices natural farming without artificial fertilizers and avoids deep bore wells. Kothala had a silent eye on the fertile land owned by Virumaandi as it had the only rich underground water availability. He treats Virumaandi as his nephew. Virumaandi falls in love with Annalakshmi after he tames her stubborn bull at jallikattu. That night, his grandmother dies, and two days later, an attempt is made on Virumaandi's life. Annalakshmi finds him and admits him to the hospital. Gradually, she falls in love with him. She teaches him the importance of apology and forgiveness. A clash at the peace Panchayat insults Kothala's gang, and their need for revenge infuriates Annalakshmi, who asks Virumaandi to apologize to the elders whom he insulted. He goes to apologize single-handedly at night to Nayakkar's village, but Kothala and his men, thinking he has gone to take revenge, come in groups and hack down innocents to death, despite his pleas. Kothala uses his clout to get out of the murder charge, but Virumaandi, who was not involved in the bloodbath, is disturbed because he had to lie in court to save Kothala and his kin. As part of the penance, he transfers all his land for the affected villagers. Annalakshmi asks him to marry her and leave the village. He marries her at the village temple, goes away at night with her, and stays with his aunt, whose son he helped. They consummate their marriage that night.

Kothala's men come the next day, when Virumaandi was away, and abduct Annalakshmi, forcibly taking her home. Kothala and his gang remove her thaali, and forcibly get her married again, to Kothala's nephew Kottaisamy. This is to ensure that Annalakshmi's share in property does not go to Virumaandi. Kottaisamy is then asked by Kothala to consummate his marriage immediately, by raping Annalakshmi. Unable to tolerate, Annalakshmi avoids Kottaisamy and hangs herself. Upon hearing the news, a distraught Virumaandi enters Kothala's house to kill the gang. He takes revenge by hacking Kothala's four men, including Kottaisamy, to death but finds Kothala holding his own son upside down on a staircase. Virumaandi places his weapon down, and Kothala escapes. Nayakkar shelters Virumaandi and sends him off to Chennai. Kothala and his men corner Nayakkar to hand over Virumaandi. A melee ensues in which Nayakkar is killed. Virumaandi turns up in court, where he finds that all evidence is framed against him. He is convicted of having raped and killed Annalakshmi and later on being the main reason for killing Kothala's four relatives, and also the main accused for the murder of 26 lives in Nayakkar's village. He is sentenced to the first six years in jail, followed by death by hanging. He turns approver in the latter case, causing the jailing of Kothala and his men.

While leaving the jail, Angela's cameraman discreetly films a conversation between Peykkaman and other jail wardens and convicts to bump off Chief Jailer Jayanth. This is because all of them traffic drugs into the prison, and this is now under investigation by Jayanth. Peykkaman also reveals that Virumaandi never killed anyone except Kottaisamy, but his explicit charge sheet got him a death sentence. A revolt among the jail staff leads to a jailbreak, as Jayanth gets stabbed and Virumaandi saves the evidence and Angela from Peykkaman and his henchmen. Jayanth insists Virumaandi to wear a police uniform and safely get Angela out of the jail. When Virumaandi and Angela are about to leave the jail, Kothala stabs Virumaandi, proving that Virumaandi was true all the time. Virumaandi then barehandedly almost kills Kothala, but Angela insists not to kill him. Kothala ends up being killed in the melee, while Virumaandi and Angela escape. The riot is stopped, and Angela presents the evidence in court. Angela applies for Virumaandi's clemency to the President of India, stating that the six-year prison sentence is enough as he did not commit any other offense other than the action of instant emotion, and to release him immediately. Virumaandi, on TV, pleas for a quick judgement, either to reach Annalakshmi by hanging to death or to live life as a silent man, seeking retribution.

Cast 

Kamal Haasan as Virumaandi thevar
Pasupathy as Kothala Thevar
Abhirami as Annalakshmi virumandi thevar
Rohini as Dr. Angela Kaathamuthu
Napoleon as Nallama Nayakkar
Shanmugarajan as Deputy Jailer Paykkaman Thevar
Nassar as Chief Jailer Jayanth
S. N. Lakshmi as Virumaandi's grandmother
Rajesh as Chennai Police Commissioner
Pyramid Natarajan as Advocate Vaidyanathan Iyer
Periya Karuppu Thevar as Temple Priest
O. A. K. Sundar as Kottaisamy Thevar
Sujatha Sivakumar as Pechi (Kothala's wife)
Bala Singh as Rasu Kalai Thevar
Thennavan as Kondarasu Nayakkar
G. Gnanasambandam as Jallikattu Commentator
Karate Raja as Virumandi's friend
Sukumar as Virumandi's friend
Kottachi Marimuthu as Virumandi's friend
Vikram Dharma as Gopal (Jail Warden)
Sai Dheena as Jail Warden
Ganthimathi
V. R. Krishna Iyer as himself in Introduction
Bagla as Oomayan

Production 
The film was launched on 18 April 2003 under the title Sandiyar at Madurai. K. Krishnasamy, the leader of Pudhiya Tamizhagam, a caste-based political organisation in Tamil Nadu protested against the title Sandiyar, citing that it might create problems. The film was later retitled Virumaandi. Shrutika was initially chosen as the lead actress, but ultimately did not continue.

For the scenes involving Jallikattu, real-life bulls were brought in and were recorded live and also Nuendo machine was kept at the shooting venue. Due to political controversy, Kamal had to shift the shoot from Madurai to Chennai. Prabhakar, art director recreated the set of Madurai villages in Chennai.

Cinematographer Keshav Prakash, who was trained in India and the United States, was an assistant to Ravi K. Chandran in Marudhanayagam project. Both Kamal Haasan and Keshav Prakash tried to make the film in high definition mode but had to abandon the project due to some technical snags.

Music 
The music was composed by Ilaiyaraaja.

Release 
The film was certified "A" (adults only) by the censor board for excessive violence. In 2015, Virumaandi was screened at the Habitat Film Festival. It was released on Amazon Prime Video on 14 January 2021.

Reception

Critical response 
Critics praised the screenplay and performances of the cast, but criticised the excessive violence. Sify called it "vital, sardonic and disturbing brave attempt at good cinema with a provocative message. It is an eloquent argument against capital punishment without excusing the killer for his crimes." Shobha Warrier of Rediff.com wrote, "Virumaandi is definitely a Kamal film but this one belongs to Kamal the director, not Kamal the actor." Malathi Rangarajan of The Hindu wrote "Virumaandi"s case it [..] is backed by a strong story, astute screenplay, stirring dialogue and deft direction". Malini Mannath of Chennai Online wrote, "the film yet again reveals Kamal Haasan’s undying passion for cinema, his desire and boldness to experiment, irrespective of commercial viability." G. Ulaganathan of Deccan Herald wrote, "It is a disturbing but brave attempt with a provocative message--It is an eloquent argument against capital punishment", but criticised the excessive violence. Visual Dasan of Kalki praised Kamal for screenplay and direction while also praising Prabhakar's work for recreating real prison set, Ilayaraja for using songs and background score effectively in sync with the story and that their contributions lent helping hand to Kamal Haasan.

Box office 
The film released on 456 screens worldwide and first in Tamil cinema with crossing 400 screens. The film got the best opening among Pongal releases grossing 6 crores in first weekend worldwide.

Accolades 
At the eighth Puchon International Fantastic Film Festival, held in South Korea, Virumaandi won the International Award for Best Asian Film.

Legacy 
Director Vetrimaaran cited Virumaandi as one of the inspiration for the screenplay for his national award-winning film Aadukalam. Director Lokesh Kanagaraj cited the film inspired for his Kaithi.

References

External links 
 

2000s Tamil-language films
2004 films
Bullfighting films
Fictional portrayals of the Tamil Nadu Police
Films about capital punishment
Films directed by Kamal Haasan
Films scored by Ilaiyaraaja
Films set in prison
Indian action drama films
Indian nonlinear narrative films